The IBM TouchMobile is a robust and practical hand-held computer announced by IBM in 1993.  This device has a bar code scanner with on-screen signature and data capture.  Certain models are capable of wireless communication.

The hand-held computer used a version of embedded DOS.  The processor was an 80C88 processor.  The system design also used 1.5 MB of PSRAM (Pseudostatic DRAM) and two custom chips.

References
 

TouchMobile